The Wittman W-5 Buttercup is a two place aircraft designed and built by Steve Wittman in 1938.  Designated as the Buttercup Model W, the original aircraft is housed in the Experimental Aircraft Association, EAA AirVenture Museum in Oshkosh, WI.

The Buttercup was considered as the basis for a four place certified production model by Fairchild Aircraft. Fairchild executives were impressed with the aircraft that chance landed at their factory airport in Hagerstown, Maryland. Wittman sold production rights, but Fairchild did not pursue the effort due to wartime production obligations.

Experimental Aircraft Association member Earl Luce developed a replica Buttercup design which first flew April 14, 2002.  His representation of the Buttercup design is available as a set of plans for home builders.

Specifications (1938 Wittman Buttercup - Model W - N18268)

References

External links 

 Experimental Aircraft Association 
 LuceAir - The Homebuilt Rag & Tube Aircraft Experts
 EAA AirVenture Museum
 Buttercup Building Log

Homebuilt aircraft
Buttercup
Aircraft first flown in 1938
Single-engined tractor aircraft
High-wing aircraft
United States sport aircraft